Gornje Stopanje is a village in the municipality of Leskovac, Serbia. According to the 2002 census, the town has a population of 1756 people.

References

Populated places in Jablanica District